The Perfect Husband is the debut feature film of Priya Singh Paul, an Indian-Jewish filmmaker. Trained in film making in India and the US, she has built a considerable reputation for herself in India's competitive and demanding television scene. The film, a romantic comedy cum social satire, predominantly in English with a smattering of Hindi and Punjabi, is a modern and thought-provoking look at the Indian marriage 'game' – the quest for the only security symbol that most Indian women possesses: a husband, perfect or otherwise!

The film was invited to the Palm Springs International Film Festival in January 2003 and shown in Cannes Film Festival in May 2004.

However, a court case on flimsy ground by the co financier stalled the release.

Plot
The Perfect Husband is the beautiful story of Jaya [21], who, inspired by the Shakespearean ideal of "the marriage of true minds" and heavily influenced by the American trend of "finding your own mate" rebels against tradition and family. She sets out to find a man who truly loves and values her – one who does not treat her like a vassal meant only to satisfy his needs, like some men do !!!

And it is the story of Uma [30] who resolves never to marry any willing, over the hill man, just because her family believes that an unsuitable alliance is better than no alliance at all !!!

The film is a funny, sad, satirical, serious, compassionate, wicked revelation of the follies and foibles of a society that considers the birth of a girl, "a curse", where abuse by the husband is taken for granted, and a woman's worth is judged by three factors alone—that she be married by the age of 25, that she should amply satisfy the monetary demands of her in-laws and that she produce a male heir within a year of holy matrimony!

The film, a romantic comedy cum social satire, predominantly in English with a smattering of Hindi and Punjabi, is a modern and thought-provoking look at the Indian marriage 'game' – the quest for the only security symbol that most Indian women possesses: a husband, perfect or otherwise! The Perfect Husband is the beautiful story of Jaya [21], who, inspired by the Shakespearean ideal of "the marriage of true minds" and heavily influenced by the American trend of "finding your own mate" rebels against tradition and family. She sets out to find a man who truly loves and values her – one who does not treat her like a vassal meant only to satisfy his needs, like some men do !!!

And it is the story of Uma [30] who resolves never to marry any willing, over the hill man, just because her family believes that an unsuitable alliance is better than no alliance at all !!!

The film is a funny, sad, satirical, serious, compassionate, wicked revelation of the follies and foibles of a society that considers the birth of a girl, "a curse", where abuse by the husband is taken for granted, and a woman's worth is judged by three factors alone—that she be married by the age of 25, that she should amply satisfy the monetary demands of her in-laws and that she produce a male heir within a year of holy matrimony!

Cast 
 Parvin Dabas
 Neha Dubey
 Sinia Duggal
 Amin Hajee
 Pavan Malhotra
 Will Randall
 Rajeshwari Sachdev

Soundtrack

The Perfect Husbands songs are composed by Sukhwinder Singh and Times Music acquired the music rights of the film.

Track listing

References

External links
 

2003 films
Indian romantic comedy films
Films featuring songs by Pritam
Films shot in Chandigarh
2003 romantic comedy films
Fox Star Studios films